The nevel or nebel ( nēḇel) was a stringed instrument used by the Israelites. The Greeks translated the name as nabla (νάβλα, "Phoenician harp").

A number of possibilities have been proposed for what kind of instrument the nevel was; these include the psaltery and the kithara, both of which are strummed instruments like the kinnor, with strings running across the sound box, like the modern guitar and zither. Most scholars believe the nevel was a frame harp, a plucked instrument with strings rising up from its sound box.

The King James Version renders the word into English as psaltery or viol, and the Book of Common Prayer renders it lute.

The word nevel has been adopted for "harp" in Modern Hebrew.

See also
 Lyres of Ur
 Nabla symbol

References

Lyres
Lost and extinct musical instruments
Ancient Hebrew musical instruments
Early musical instruments